Events in the year 1890 in Germany.

Incumbents

National level
 Kaiser – Wilhelm II
 Chancellor – Otto von Bismarck to March 20, then Leo von Caprivi

State level

Kingdoms
 King of Bavaria – Otto of Bavaria
 King of Prussia – Kaiser Wilhelm II
 King of Saxony – Albert of Saxony
 King of Württemberg – Charles I of Württemberg

Grand Duchies
 Grand Duke of Baden – Frederick I
 Grand Duke of Hesse – Louis IV
 Grand Duke of Mecklenburg-Schwerin – Frederick Francis III
 Grand Duke of Mecklenburg-Strelitz – Frederick William
 Grand Duke of Oldenburg – Peter II
 Grand Duke of Saxe-Weimar-Eisenach – Charles Alexander

Principalities
 Schaumburg-Lippe – Adolf I, Prince of Schaumburg-Lippe
 Schwarzburg-Rudolstadt – George Albert, Prince of Schwarzburg-Rudolstadt to 12 March, then Günther Victor, Prince of Schwarzburg-Rudolstadt
 Schwarzburg-Sondershausen – Karl Günther, Prince of Schwarzburg-Sondershausen
 Principality of Lippe – Woldemar, Prince of Lippe
 Reuss Elder Line – Heinrich XXII, Prince Reuss of Greiz
 Reuss Younger Line – Heinrich XIV, Prince Reuss Younger Line
 Waldeck and Pyrmont – George Victor, Prince of Waldeck and Pyrmont

Duchies
 Duke of Anhalt – Frederick I, Duke of Anhalt
 Duke of Brunswick – Prince Albert of Prussia (regent)
 Duke of Saxe-Altenburg – Ernst I, Duke of Saxe-Altenburg
 Duke of Saxe-Coburg and Gotha – Ernst II, Duke of Saxe-Coburg and Gotha
 Duke of Saxe-Meiningen – Georg II, Duke of Saxe-Meiningen

Colonial Governors
 Cameroon (Kamerun) – Eugen von Zimmerer (acting governor) (2nd term) to (17 April), then Markus Graf Pfeil, to 3 August, then ... Kurz (acting governor) to December 2, then Jesko von Puttkamer (acting governor) (2nd term)
 German East Africa (Deutsch-Ostafrika) – Hermann Wissmann (commissioner) (1st term)
 German New Guinea (Deutsch-Neuguinea) – Fritz Rose (acting commissioner to 30 September, then commissioner)
 German South-West Africa (Deutsch-Südwestafrika) – Heinrich Ernst Göring (acting commissioner) to August, then Louis Nels (acting commissioner)
 Togoland – Eugen von Zimmerer (commissioner)
 Wituland (Deutsch-Witu) – Gustav Denhardt (resident) to 1 July

Events

 5 February – German company Allianz is founded in Berlin.
 20 February – German federal election, 1890
 20 March – Bismarck cabinet ends.
 1 July — Heligoland–Zanzibar Treaty. Germany receives Heligoland and the Caprivi Strip from the United Kingdom and a free hand to control and acquire the coast of Dar es Salam. In return, Germany renounces its protectorate over Wituland (part of modern-day Kenya) and pledges not to interfere in the actions of the UK vis-à-vis the Sultanate of Zanzibar. The U.K. cedes sovereignty of the Heligoland archipelago to Germany.
 16 July - German company Mannesmann is founded in Düsseldorf.
 August — Kaiser Wilhelm and Tsar Alexander III of Russia meet at Narva.

Date unknown
 German physician and physiologist Emil von Behring publishes an article with Kitasato Shibasaburo reporting that they have developed "antitoxins" against both diphtheria and tetanus in Berlin.

Births

 9 January – Kurt Tucholsky, German journalist, satirist and writer (died 1935)
 30 January – Albert Zürner, German diver (died 1920)
 6 February – Karl Schelenz, German sport teacher (died 1956)
 20 February – Georg Thomas, German general (died 1946)
 5 March – Wilhelm Boden, German politician (died 1961)
 22 March – Ewald von Kleist-Schmenzin, German politician (died 1945)
 22 April – Erwin Jaenecke, German general (died 1960)
 10 May – Alfred Jodl, German general (died 1946)
 15 June – Wilhelm Leuschner, German politician (died 1944)
 25 June – Hans Marchwitza, German writer and poet (died 1965)
 4 July – Otto Feick, German gymnast (died 1959)
 8 July – Walter Hasenclever, German poet and playwright (died 1940)
 29 July – Elisabeth von Thadden, German educator and resistance fighter (died 1944)
 30 July – Ludwig Schwamb, German politician (died 1945)
 3 August – Eduard Zuckmayer, German writer and playwright (died 1972)
 4 August – Erich Weinert, German author (died 1953)
 14 August – Bruno Tesch, German chemist and Nazi war criminal (died 1946)
 18 August – Walther Funk, German banker and economist (died 1960)
 16 September – Traugott Herr, German general (died 1976)
 23 September – Friedrich Paulus, German field marshal (died 1957)
 10 October – Emil Schäpe, German fighter pilot (died 1925)
 2 December – C. Paul Jennewein, German-American sculptor (died 1978)
 6 December:
 Hans Bethge, German pilot (died 1918)
 Carl Jules Weyl, German-American art director and Reichswehr soldier (died 1948)
 17 December – Prince Joachim of Prussia, German nobleman (died 1920)

Deaths

 7 January - Augusta of Saxe-Weimar-Eisenach, German queen (born 1811)
 20 January – Franz Lachner, German composer and conductor (born 1803)
 27 January – Karl Friedrich Otto Westphal, German  psychiatrist (born 1833)
 18 March – Johann Georg Halske, German businessman (born 1814)
 19 March – George Albert, Prince of Schwarzburg-Rudolstadt, German nobleman (born 1838)
 27 March – Carl Jacob Löwig, German chemist (born 1803)
 30 April – Hermann von Dechend, German politician who served as the first President of the Reichsbank (born 1814)
 26 May – Adelbert Delbrück, German banker and businessman (born 1822)
 27 August - Emil Otto Grundmann, German painter (born 1844)
 3 September - Johann von Lutz, German politician (born 1826)
 15 September – Christian Ferdinand Friedrich Krauss, German scientist (born 1812)
 19 September – Friedrich Gaedcke, German chemist (born 1828)
 23 September - Lorenz von Stein, German economist and sociologist (born 1815)
 4 November - Helene Demuth, German housekeeper (born 1820)
 3 December – Gottfried Ludolf Camphausen, German politician (born 1803)
 26 December - Heinrich Schliemann, German businessman and a pioneer in the field of archaeology (born 1822)

Citations

 
Years of the 19th century in Germany